Peter Powell is the name of:

Peter Powell (DJ) (born 1951), British DJ
Peter Powell (kite maker) (1932–2016), inventor of a dual-line, steerable model of flying kite